Gentofte Badminton Klub (Gentofte Badminton Klub), also known as GBK is a badminton club in Gentofte, Gentofte Municipality, Copenhagen, Denmark. It is based in Gentofte Sportsby. The club has won more than 100 titles. It experienced its most successful period in the late 1970s and 1980 when it won Europe Cup seven times. Former players include some of Denmark's most successful badminton players, including, Morten Frost, Lene Køppen, Poul-Erik Høyer, Peter Gade and Camilla Martin.

History
Gentofte Badminton Klub (Gentofte Badminton or GBK) was founded on 10 February 1931. The club initially played in rented premises on Maltegårdsvej in Charlottenlund until inaugurating its current badminton hall in 1936.

Location
The club is based in GBK Hallen in Gentofte Sportsby. The venue contains 10 badminton courts.

Former players
 Poul Holm
 Aase Schiøtt Jacobsen
 Ole Jensen
  Tonny Ahm
 Per Walsøe
 Anne Flint
 Marko Daraboš
 Ib Frederiksen
 Bente Flint
 Steen Skovgaard
 Kirsten Larsen
 Flemming Delfs
 Lene Køppen
 Poul-Erik Høyer
 Pernille Dupont
 Morten Frost
 Grete Mogensen
 Peter Gade
 Camilla Martin

Achievements

Europe Cup
 Champions: 1978, 1979, 1981, 1982, 1983, 1985, 1986
 Runner-Up: 1984

Danish Badminton League
 Champion:1949/1950, 1950/1951, 1951/1952, 1974/1975,  1975/1976,  1976/1977, 1977/1978, 1978/1979, 1982/1983, 1983/1984, 1985/1986,  1988/1989, 1989/1990, 1990/1991,1991/1992,1996/1997

Danish National Badminton Championships

References

External links
 Official website

Badminton clubs in Copenhagen
Sport in Gentofte Municipality
1931 establishments in Denmark